The Passlab Yamagata Wyverns is a professional basketball team that competes in the second division of the Japanese B.League. TGI D-Rise served as a development team of the Link Tochigi Brex. TGI stands for Tochigi, Gunma and Ibaraki, three northern Kanto prefectures.

Roster

Notable players

Will Creekmore
Anthony Elechi
Torian Graham
Gary Hamilton
Stephen Hurt
Billy Knight
Chukwudiebere Maduabum 		
Billy McShepard
Yoshifumi Nakajima
Justin Reynolds
Magnum Rolle
Seth Tarver
Shusuke Yamamoto

TGI D-Rise players
Paul Butorac
Tatsunori Fujie
Masashi Hosoya
Yuto Otsuka
Lamar Rice
Noriyuki Sugasawa

Coaches

Atsushi Kanazawa
Koju Munakata
Joe Cook
Yuta Ryan Koseki [tl]
Ryutaro Onodera
Ryuji Kawai
Sho Higashijima
Miodrag Rajković

Arenas
Yamagata Prefectural General Sports Park Gymnasium
Yamagata City General Sports Center

Practice facilities

Yamanobe Citizens General Gymnasium

References

Basketball teams in Japan
Sports teams in Yamagata Prefecture
Tendō, Yamagata
Basketball teams established in 2009
2009 establishments in Japan